Bente Pedersen (born 22 March 1961, in Skibotn, Norway) is a Norwegian novelist. She has written many historical novels, for example Raija (40 volumes), Rosa (35 volumes), Sara (6 volumes), Liljene (3 volumes) and Huset arent (21 volumes). Pedersen has  also written many individual books:

 Mannen som fløy (1999)
 Vi står han av (2004)
 Best uten ball? (2005)

References

1961 births
Living people
People from Storfjord
20th-century Norwegian novelists
21st-century Norwegian novelists